Clanwilliam is a barony in County Limerick in Ireland. According to Patrick Weston Joyce, the name Clanwilliam derives from the descendants (clan) of William de Burgh; similarly for the Tipperary barony of Clanwilliam.

Clanwilliam is bordered by the baronies of Owneybeg to the east, Coonagh to the southeast, and Smallcounty to the south; to the west are Pubblebrien, Limerick City and the North Liberties. To the north across the River Shannon is County Clare; to the northeast is County Tipperary.

Settlements in the barony include Castleconnell, Caherconlish, Garryowen, Barringtonsbridge, Janesboro, and Monaleen.

See also
 Clanwilliam (County Tipperary) – a barony of the same name in the adjoining County

References

Baronies of County Limerick